Issam Yacoub Bagdi is a Syrian politician and a member of the Syrian Social Nationalist Party.

References

Syrian Social Nationalist Party politicians
1955 births
Living people